Marçon is a commune in the Sarthe department in the region of Pays de la Loire in north-western France. It is also a minor, but well-liked wine-producing area.

Geography
Marçon is a commune located in southern Sarthe in the Loir valley, between Château-du-Loir and La Chartre-sur-le-Loir on the departmental road N° 305. The climate is of a moderate nature and the farmland is fertile.

Towns bordering
 Beaumont-sur-Dême
 Chahaignes
 La Chartre-sur-le-Loir
 Lhomme
 Dissay-sous-Courcillon
 Flée
 Vouvray-sur-Loir

Administration

Demographics

History

It was occupied by Germany in World War II, but was not conquered by Germany in World War I.

Religious heritage

 Notre Dame, she was dedicated April 25, 1500 by the Archbishop of Tours, Bishop of Bénéhard. The tower is surmounted by a spire covered with slate that is slightly twisted, so that this church is listed as having a twisted tower. The angle turns 1 / 16  th  from right to left.

Civil Heritage
The school dining room Le Corbusier: In 1957, the famous architect was contacted by the mayor at the time Mr Armand de Malherbe, drew with his colleague Andre Wogenscky, plans for the school canteen which subsequently opened in 1960.

Economy
 Wines from Coteaux du Loir.

Monuments and tourist spots
Lac des Varennes: lake of 50 hectares converted into leisure with water-slide, beach, area picnic, games for children, mini-golf, fishing, sailing, pedal boats, archery. Entrance fee in season, free for residents and for campers staying at the neighbouring campsite, Camping du Lac des Varennes.  See their web site here "Camping du Lac des Varennes" or visit their blog site.

Events
 May-Day sailing
 August: Concentration old vehicles and prestige

See also
Communes of the Sarthe department

References

External links

 official website of the Municipality of Marçon
 Ani'Marçon: festive events Marçon
 The official website Sailing Club Marconi

Communes of Sarthe
Wine regions of France